Alina Treiger (born 1979) is the first female rabbi to be ordained in Germany since World War II.

Biography
Treiger was born in Poltava, Ukraine. Following the collapse of the Soviet Union, Treiger formed a Jewish youth club in Poltava and then traveled to Moscow to study at the Institute of Progressive Judaism. After finishing her studies, she founded Congregation Beit Am, a liberal congregation in her hometown. She emigrated to Germany in 2001. Among Treiger's inspirations was Regina Jonas, Germany's first female rabbi, who was ordained in 1935.

She was ordained in November 2010 by the Abraham Geiger College. Her ordination was held at Berlin's Pestalozzistrasse Synagogue, and attended by Christian Wulff, then president of Germany, and Jewish leaders from around the world.

Treiger moved to Germany because she felt stifled by the Orthodox Jewish community in Ukraine. Germany has needed more rabbis in order to handle the influx of Soviet Jews who have emigrated to Germany since the dissolution of the Soviet Union. She works primarily with the Russian-speaking Jewish immigrants in the city of Oldenburg and the nearby town of Delmenhorst.

See also
Timeline of women rabbis

References 

1979 births
20th-century Ukrainian Jews
21st-century German rabbis
Former Orthodox Jews
German people of Ukrainian-Jewish descent
German Reform rabbis
Living people
People from Poltava
Ukrainian emigrants to Germany
Ukrainian expatriates in Russia
Reform women rabbis